Antaeotricha disjecta is a moth in the family Depressariidae. It was described by Philipp Christoph Zeller in 1854. It is found in Costa Rica, the Guianas, Bolivia and Brazil (Para).

References

Moths described in 1854
disjecta
Moths of Central America
Moths of South America